Aarne Reini (August 6, 1906 – February 23, 1974) was a Finnish wrestler and Olympic medalist in Greco-Roman wrestling.

Olympics
Reini competed at the 1936 Summer Olympics in Berlin where he received a silver medal in Greco-Roman wrestling, the featherweight class. He also competed at the 1932 Summer Olympics.

References

External links
 

1906 births
1974 deaths
Olympic wrestlers of Finland
Wrestlers at the 1932 Summer Olympics
Wrestlers at the 1936 Summer Olympics
Finnish male sport wrestlers
Olympic silver medalists for Finland
Olympic medalists in wrestling
Medalists at the 1936 Summer Olympics
20th-century Finnish people